A free-radical reaction is any chemical reaction involving free radicals. This reaction type is abundant in organic reactions. Two pioneering studies into free radical reactions have been the discovery of the triphenylmethyl radical by Moses Gomberg (1900) and the lead-mirror experiment described by Friedrich Paneth in 1927. In this last experiment tetramethyllead is decomposed at elevated temperatures to methyl radicals and elemental lead in a quartz tube. The gaseous methyl radicals are moved to another part of the chamber in a carrier gas where they react with lead in a mirror film which slowly disappears.

When radical reactions are part of organic synthesis the radicals are often generated from radical initiators such as peroxides or azobis compounds. Many radical reactions are chain reactions with a chain initiation step, a chain propagation step and a chain termination step. Reaction inhibitors slow down a radical reaction and radical disproportionation is a competing reaction. Radical reactions occur frequently in the gas phase, are often initiated by light, are rarely acid or base catalyzed and are not dependent on polarity of the reaction medium. Reactions are also similar whether in the gas phase or solution phase.

Kinetics 

The chemical kinetics of a radical reaction depend on all these individual reactions. In steady state the concentrations of initiating (I.) and terminating species T. are negligent and rate of initiation and rate of termination are equal. The overall reaction rate can be written as:

with a broken-order dependence of 1.5 with respect to the initiating species.

The reactivity of different compounds toward a certain radical is measured in so-called competition experiments. Compounds bearing carbon–hydrogen bonds react with radicals in the order primary < secondary < tertiary < benzyl < allyl reflecting the order in C–H bond dissociation energy

Many stabilizing effects can be explained as resonance effects, an effect specific to radicals is the captodative effect.

Reactions 
The most important reaction types involving free radicals are:
 Free-radical substitution, for instance free-radical halogenation and autoxidation.
 Free-radical addition reactions
 Intramolecular free radical reactions (substitution or addition) such as the Hofmann–Löffler reaction or the Barton reaction
 Free radical rearrangement reactions are rare compared to rearrangements involving carbocations and restricted to aryl migrations.
 Fragmentation reactions or homolysis, for instance the Norrish reaction, the Hunsdiecker reaction and certain decarboxylations. For fragmentations taking place in mass spectrometry see mass spectrum analysis.
 Electron transfer. An example is the decomposition of certain peresters by Cu(I) which is a one-electron reduction reaction forming Cu(II), an alkoxy oxygen radical and a carboxylate. Another example is Kolbe electrolysis.
 Radical-nucleophilic aromatic substitution is a special case of nucleophilic aromatic substitution.
 Carbon–carbon coupling reactions, for example manganese-mediated coupling reactions.
 Elimination reactions
Free radicals can be formed by photochemical reaction and thermal fission reaction or by oxidation reduction reaction. Specific reactions involving free radicals are combustion, pyrolysis and cracking. Free radical reactions also occur within and outside of cells, are injurious, and have been implicated in a wide range of human diseases (see 13-Hydroxyoctadecadienoic acid, 9-hydroxyoctadecadienoic acid, reactive oxygen species, and Oxidative stress) as well as many of the maladies associated with ageing (see ageing).

See also
 Radical clock

References

Organic chemistry